The 2001 FIFA World Youth Championship took place in Argentina between 17 June and 8 July 2001. The 2001 championship was the 13th contested.  The tournament took part in six cities, Buenos Aires, Córdoba, Mendoza, Rosario, Salta, and Mar del Plata. The Golden Boot was won by Javier Saviola of Argentina who scored 11 goals.

Qualification
The following 24 teams qualified for the 2001 FIFA World Youth Championship. Argentina qualified automatically as host.

1.Teams that made their debut.
2.Czech Republic made their debut as independent nation. They were chosen as the descendant of the now-defunct Czechoslovakia, which qualified in 1983 and 1989 tournaments.

Venues

Mascot
The Official Mascot of the 2001 FIFA World Youth Championship is a Rhea named Ñandy, he was created by an Argentina Illustrator Conrado Giusti

Sponsorship

FIFA partners 
 Adidas
 Fujifilm
 JVC
 Avaya
 Coca-Cola
 Budweiser 
 McDonald's
 Toshiba
 Hyundai
 MasterCard

National supporters 
 FIFA.com
 FIFA Fair Play

Argentinian local partners 
Movicom 
TCC

Squads

Group stage
All times in Argentina Standard Time: (UTC−03:00)

Group A

Group B

Group C

Group D

Group E

Group F

Ranking of third-placed teams

Knockout stage

Bracket

Round of 16

Quarter-finals

Semi-finals

Third place play-off

Final

Result

Goalscorers 

11 goals
 Javier Saviola

6 goals

 Adriano
 Djibril Cissé

5 goals

 Robert
 Benjamin Auer

4 goals

 Maxi Rodríguez
 Winston Parks
 Mohamed El Yamani

3 goals

 Esteban Herrera
 Oleksiy Byelik

2 goals

 Fabricio Coloccini
 Andrés D'Alessandro
 Leandro Romagnoli
 Greg Owens
 Qu Bo
 Erick Scott
 Tomáš Jun
 Petr Musil
 Wael Riad
 Solomon Andargachew
 Hervé Bugnet
 Philippe Mexès
 Christoph Preuß
 Derek Boateng
 John Mensah
 Emad Mohammed
 Koji Yamase
 Youssouf Hersi
 Klaas-Jan Huntelaar
 Julio González
 DaMarcus Beasley

1 goal

 Mantorras
 Mendonça
 Rasca
 Diego Colotto
 Alejandro Domínguez
 Eduardo Costa
 Fernando
 Kaká
 Pinga
 Mario Berrios
 Rodrigo Millar
 Sebastián Pardo
 Jaime Valdés
 Carlos Hernández
 Christian Montero
 Michal Macek
 Jorge Guagua
 Roberto Miña
 Jorge Vargas
 Hussein Amin
 Gamal Hamza
 Abay Yordanos
 Bekele Zewdu
 Daniel Sjölund
 Mika Väyrynen
 Bernard Mendy
 Thorsten Burkhardt
 Ibrahim Abdul Razak
 Michael Essien
 Abass Inusah
 Ammar Hanoosh
 Salah Al-Deen Siamand
 Fabian Dawkins
 Koji Morisaki
 Yutaka Tahara
 Jurgen Colin
 Santi Kolk
 Rahamat Mustapha
 Rafael van der Vaart
 Pedro Benítez
 José Devaca
 Walter Fretes
 Felipe Giménez
 Tomás Guzmán
 Santiago Salcedo
 Denis Stoyan
 Ruslan Valeyev
 Kenny Arena
 Edson Buddle
 Brad Davis

Awards

Final ranking

External links
FIFA World Youth Championship Argentina 2001 , FIFA.com
RSSSF > FIFA World Youth Championship > 2001
FIFA Technical Report

Fifa World Youth Championship, 2001
FIFA
FIFA World Youth Championship
International association football competitions hosted by Argentina
June 2001 sports events in South America
July 2001 sports events in South America